Paul Gorries (born 28 February 1981 in Cape Town) is a South African sprinter.

Competition record

Personal bests
100 metres - 10.43 s (2000)
200 metres - 20.59 s (2000)
400 metres - 45.30 s (2003)

External links
 

1981 births
Living people
Sportspeople from Cape Town
South African male sprinters
Commonwealth Games silver medallists for South Africa
Commonwealth Games medallists in athletics
Athletes (track and field) at the 2006 Commonwealth Games
World Athletics Championships athletes for South Africa
Athletes (track and field) at the 1999 All-Africa Games
Athletes (track and field) at the 2007 All-Africa Games
African Games competitors for South Africa
20th-century South African people
21st-century South African people
Medallists at the 2006 Commonwealth Games